Paternò is a southern Italian town and comune of the Metropolitan City of Catania, Sicily. With a population (2016) of 48,009, it is the third municipality of the province after Catania and Acireale.

Geography 

Paternò borders with the municipalities of Belpasso, Biancavilla, Catenanuova (EN), Centuripe (EN), Ragalna, Ramacca and Santa Maria di Licodia. Its only hamlet (frazione) is the village of Sferro.
 
Within Paterno there is a geologic feature named 'Salinelle', a place where small mud volcanoes emerge from cracks in the ground. This area in which the Salinelle surfaces includes an archeological site currently uncovering evidence of Roman baths previously built on and thought to have used the Salinelle mud.

History

The site of Paterno was settled before 3500 BC. Its inhabitants were probably the Sicani, although it was located in mainly Sicel territory. The modern name derives form the Greek Paeter Aitnaion, meaning the "Fortress of the Etnaeans". 

Ancient historians refer to two contiguous or nearby cities of Sican origin: Hybla Gereatis and Inessa (later renamed Aetna). Most modern scholars regard the place called Castro as the site of Aetna, about 4 km northeast from Paternò, on a hill projecting from the foot of the mountain.

It was a centre of medium importance in the Greek and Roman eras.

Hybla and Inessa fell into Greek hands around 460 BC, when they were besieged by the Syracusans led by the tyrant Hieron I and the two centres were thus Hellenised. They were also involved in the wars between the Syracusans and the Athenians and devastated by the latter, and later again by the former in 403 BC when Dionysius I of Syracuse came to power; in 396 BC he sent mercenaries to Aetna from Campania who carried out numerous massacres of the population for favouring the Athenians in 415 BC. Aetna and Hybla together with the other cities of eastern Sicily were liberated in 339 BC by the Corinthians led by general Timoleon.

The Greek "Silver of Paterno" treasure was found in 1909 and sold, but the majority is now in the Altesmuseum in Berlin.

In 264 BC, the First Punic War broke out between the Carthaginians and the Romans and Aetna and Hybla sided with the former, but after their defeat the two villages fell inexorably under Roman domination. The Romans led by the consul Manius Otacilius Crassus entered Aetna around 243 BC and conquered 67 other Sicilian cities.

Sicily became a Roman province and suffered Roman tyranny and exploitation with the enslavement of its inhabitants. In 136 BC this led to the revolt led by Eunus and Cleone of Cilicia in the First Servile War. During this battle, Aetna served as a place of refuge for many rebels, but together with Hybla, it suffered the greatest damage at the end of the Second Servile War as agricultural and pastoral lands were damaged. The situation worsened further when Gaius Verres, praetor in Sicily in 73 BC, ordered extortion, robbery and violence of all kinds on the two towns, forcing them to deliver of 300 000 bushels of wheat and the payment of 50 000 sesterces. 

Aetna and Hybla were included in the cities of civitates decumanae, liable to pay Rome the decuma tax of one tenth, and not enjoying the rights of other cities as they had been conquered after offering resistance. 

The longest aqueduct in Roman Sicily at 24 km length passed through the territory close to the city on its route to Catania.

It was largely depopulated in the three centuries before 1000 AD; during the subsequent Arab domination of Sicily, it was known as Batarnù. After the Norman conquest in the 1040s, they built the castle and founded the current city; it was renamed Paternionis and began a period of flourishing. It was here that King Frederick III of Sicily created the Camera Reginale ("Queen's Chamber") as a wedding gift for his wife Eleanor of Anjou, and this was inherited by the subsequent Queens of Sicily. This period of splendour for Paternò lasted until the 15th century, when it became a fief and in consequence slowly lost importance.

Historically, the area around Paternò was plagued by malaria, caused by the marshlands of the Plain of Catania. This has since long been remedied, and the urban development of the town enjoyed a large acceleration in the 1960s and 1970s.

The Paterno Treasure

The treasure was found by chance by a peasant woman in 1909 near the Norman fortress and consisted of 13 or more exquisite pieces. The silverware was sold for little money to two dealers from Catania, who divided it so that most ended up in Naples and was bought by the Parisian merchants Cesare and Ercole Canessa. They had the silverware restored by Alfred André, and in 1911 in Paris they sold seven pieces to Robert Zahn, curator of the antiquarium of the Royal Museums of Berlin. In 1913 and 1914, the remaining six pieces came into the possession of the Antiquarium as a donation from the wealthy Berlin family Von Siemens who had bought them from Zahn himself. Zahn gave an date between the 4th and 3rd centuries BC and attributed the silver to a Taranto goldsmith stylistically. Between 1912 and 1915, Paolo Orsi (who did not fully understand the historico-archaeological importance of hill of Paterno) announced that, in addition to the silverware treasure, two coin treasures were found on the same hill: the first, partly lost, from the 5th century BC, the second of the Roman-Republican age.

Recently the shell-shaped pyx equipped with hinge and ring and decorated on the outside with an octopus has been attributed rather to Alexandrian-inspired artists of the 3rd century BC.

Six of the vessels have inscriptions naming three or four different owners suggesting that the vessels came from Taranto but were acquired in Sicily during the 3rd century BC. The last owner may have been a Roman landlord who feared the ravages of Verres and might have hidden away his silver before 70 BC.

Main sights

Norman Castle, built in 1072 by order of Roger I of Sicily.
Santa Maria dell'Alto: Mother Church (Chiesa Madre) of the town, built in 1342 and largely modified in the early 18th century. It is connected by a scenic staircase to the Porta del Borgo
San Francesco alla Collina (1346), with a church in Gothic style and remains of Baroque decorations.
Rococo church of Cristo al Monte.
Santa Caterina d'Alessandria
Santa Maria della Valle di Iosaphat, commissioned in 1072 by Adelaide del Vasto, with a Gothic portal.
Associazione Culturale Paternesi.com, a cultural association born in November 2002, from an idea of Giorgio Ciancitto, to take care of the city of Paternò around the world.
''Sanctuary of the Madonna Santissima della Consolazione
The Paterno Salinelle site.

Notable people
 

Angelo Lo Jacono (1838–1898), writer and journalist

Transportation
Paternò is served by three state roads leading to Catania, Randazzo and Troina areas.

The train station was originally used mostly for food transportation, and is now out of service. The main passenger station is part of the narrow gauge Ferrovia Circumetnea. The latter also provides a regular bus service to destination on the Catania-Adrano line.

Twin towns
 Santa Barbara, USA, since 1978
 Sesto Fiorentino, Italy, since 1981
 Menden, Germany, since 1987

References

External links

 
Municipalities of the Metropolitan City of Catania
Castles in Italy